Northwestern Europe, or Northwest Europe, is a loosely defined subregion of Europe, overlapping Northern and Western Europe. The region can be defined both geographically and ethnographically.

Geographic definitions
Geographically, Northwestern Europe usually consists of the United Kingdom, Ireland, Belgium, the Netherlands, Luxembourg, Northern France, Germany, Denmark, Norway, Sweden, and Iceland. Switzerland, Finland, and Austria are also often considered part of Northwestern Europe. Southern France is not regarded as northwestern, as it is usually geographically and culturally considered part of the Mediterranean region or Southern Europe.

Ethnographic definitions

Germanic languages are widely spoken in most of Northwestern Europe, although other languages are also present, including Romance languages in Northern France, Southern Belgium, Luxembourg, and some parts of Switzerland; Celtic languages along the western fringes of the British Isles and in Brittany; and Uralic languages in parts of the Nordic countries. The region also has a strong history of Protestantism that differentiates it from its Catholic and Orthodox neighbors to the South and East. The definition of Northwestern Europe as correlating with Protestant Germanic Europe mostly leads to the same definition as the geographical one above, but would tend to exclude northern France, Belgium, much of the southern Netherlands, much of Southern Germany, Luxembourg, Liechenstein, Austria, Finland, and Ireland. This, in part, is because northern France, despite its historical Protestant Huguenot populations (currently, however, only 2% of the French population), is traditionally and demographically considered a Catholic Romance language region, while Southern Germany, much of the southern Netherlands, Austria, Luxembourg, Liechenstein, and Ireland, though largely containing Germanic language speakers, are historically Roman Catholic; meanwhile, Finland, while overwhelmingly majority Protestant and containing a significant Germanic population, is largely a Uralic-speaking country. Belgium is unique in that it is a majority Catholic country, with both German-speaking and Romance-speaking regions. Consequently, although Northwestern Europe has a strong history of Protestantism and an overall majority Protestant and Germanic-speaking population, there are considerable Catholic and non-Germanic language populations, partially because of the majority Catholic populations indigenous to Southern Germany, Ireland, Austria, Luxembourg, Lichenstein, Belgium, and Northern France.

A definition of Northwestern Europe was used by some late 19th to mid 20th century anthropologists, eugenicists, and Nordicists, who used Northwestern Europe as a shorthand term for the region of Europe in which members of the Nordic race were concentrated. Under this racialist view, all of the Germanic countries in Europe and areas such as northern France, which historically contains large numbers of people of Gaulish, Norman, and Germanic Frankish descent, would be included as Northwestern Europe, due to a large concentration of phenotypically Nordic people within these areas.

World War II Theatre

In military history, especially in Commonwealth countries, the battle honour North-West Europe has been used to refer to the two land campaigns in that approximate area during World War II. Two separate battle honours were awarded to regiments who took part in these campaigns. The North-West Europe Campaign of 1940 during the Battle of France, was restricted to Belgium and the French Channel ports. The North-West Europe Campaign of 1944–1945 started with the landings in Normandy and ended with Field Marshal Montgomery taking the German military surrender of all German forces in the Netherlands, north-west Germany and Denmark on Lüneburg Heath in north-west Germany. It was fought by the British 21st Army Group. In the First campaign the French Army was responsible for the rest of the Western Front from Luxembourg to Switzerland, as were the American 12th Army and 6th Army Groups during the second campaign.

Units of the First Canadian Army fought in five major campaigns in North-West Europe, including the Battle of Normandy, the battles for the Channel Ports, the Battle of the Scheldt, the Rhineland fighting in February and March 1945, and the final operations east of the River Rhine. A period of static warfare existed from 1 November 1944 to 8 February 1945 during which time the First Canadian Army manned positions in the Nijmegen Salient.

Genetics
There is very close genetic affinity among Northwest European populations. This is largely due to these populations descending from closely related Corded Ware and Bell Beaker populations carrying large amounts of steppe ancestry. The Beaker people of the lower Rhine for example, overturned 90% of Great Britain and Ireland's gene pools, replacing the Basque-like neolithic populations present prior.

See also
 Germanic-speaking Europe
 North Sea Region
 White Anglo-Saxon Protestant

References

Northern Europe
Regions of Europe
Western Europe
North Sea